Kārlis Augusts Vilhelms Ulmanis (4 September 1877 – 20 September 1942) was a Latvian politician. He was one of the most prominent Latvian politicians of pre-World War II Latvia during the Interwar period of independence from November 1918 to June 1940. He served four times as prime minister, the last time as the head of an authoritarian regime, during which he subsequently also adopted the title of President of Latvia. The legacy of his dictatorship continues to divide public opinion in Latvia today.

Early life 
 
Born in a prosperous farming family, Ulmanis studied agriculture at the Swiss Federal Institute of Technology Zurich and at Leipzig University. He then worked in Latvia as a writer, lecturer, and manager in agricultural positions. He was politically active during the 1905 Revolution, was briefly imprisoned in Pskov, and subsequently fled Latvia to avoid incarceration by the Russian authorities. During this period of exile, he studied at the University of Nebraska–Lincoln in the United States as Karl August Ulmann, earning a Bachelor of Science degree in agriculture. After working briefly at that university as a lecturer, Ulmanis moved to Houston, Texas. The dairy business he had bought there ran into financial difficulties.

Ulmanis returned to Latvia from American exile in 1913, after being informed that it was now safe for political exiles to return due to the declaration of a general amnesty by Nicholas II of Russia. This safety was short-lived as World War I broke out one year later and Courland Governorate was partially occupied by Germany in 1915.

Political career in independent Latvia 
In the last stages of World War I, he founded the Latvian Farmers' Union, one of the two most prominent political parties in Latvia at that time. Ulmanis was one of the principal founders of the People's Council, which proclaimed Latvia's independence on 18 November 1918, with Ulmanis as the Prime Minister of the first Provisional government of Latvia. After the Latvian War of Independence of 1919–1920, a constitutional convention established Latvia as a parliamentary democracy in 1920.  Ulmanis served as Prime Minister in several subsequent Latvian government administrations from 1918 to 1934.

Coup of 15 May 1934 

On the night of 15–16 May 1934, Ulmanis, with the support of Minister of War Jānis Balodis, proclaimed a state of war and dissolved all political parties and the Saeima (parliament).  The bloodless coup was carried out by army and units of the national guard Aizsargi loyal to Ulmanis. They moved against key government offices, communications and transportation facilities. Many elected officials and politicians (almost exclusively Social Democrats, as well as figures from the extreme right and left) were detained, as were any military officers who resisted the coup d'etat. Some 2,000 Social Democrats were initially detained by the authorities, including most of the Social Democratic members of the disbanded Saeima, as were members of various right-wing radical organisations, such as Pērkonkrusts.

In all, 369 Social Democrats, 95 members of Pērkonkrusts, pro-Nazi activists from the Baltic German community, and a handful of politicians from other parties were interned in a prison camp established in the Karosta district of Liepāja. After several Social Democrats, such as Bruno Kalniņš, had been cleared of weapons charges by the courts, most of those imprisoned began to be released over time. Those convicted by the courts of treasonous acts, such as the leader of Pērkonkrusts Gustavs Celmiņš, remained behind bars for the duration of their sentences, three years in the case of Celmiņš.

For the next four years, Ulmanis ruled by decree, without a parliament. A decree vested the Saeima's functions in the cabinet until a new constitution could be drafted. Although the incumbent State President Alberts Kviesis did not support the coup, he remained in office and collaborated with Ulmanis.

On 19 March 1936 Ulmanis' cabinet drafted a law that provided for Ulmanis to become State President as well as Prime Minister upon the expiration of Kviesis' term. This clearly violated the Constitution, which stipulated that the chairman of the Saeima would become acting president pending new elections. However, no one dared object. When Kviesis left office on 11 April 1936, Ulmanis combined the offices of president and prime minister.

Authoritarian regime 
The Ulmanis regime was unique among other European dictatorships of the interwar period. Ulmanis did not create a ruling party, rubber-stamp parliament or a new ideology. It was a personal, paternalistic dictatorship in which Ulmanis–who called himself "the leader of the people"–claimed to do what he thought was best for Latvians. All political life was proscribed, culture and economy was eventually organized into a type of corporate statism made popular during those years by Mussolini. Chambers of Professions were created, similar to Chambers of Corporations in other dictatorships.

All political parties, including Ulmanis' own Farmers' Union, were outlawed. Part of the constitution of the Latvian Republic and civil liberties were suspended. All newspapers owned by political parties or organisations were closed and all publications were subjected to censorship and government oversight by the Ministry of Public Affairs led by Alfrēds Bērziņš. The army and the Aizsargi paramilitary were lavished with privileges.

Ulmanis is often believed to have been a popular leader especially among farmers and ethnic Latvians. This is debatable. His party had never won more than 17 percent of the vote in any election and had seen its support steadily decline in the years since the 1922 constitutional convention. In the 1931 election, the Farmers' Union only won 12.2 percent of the vote, an all-time low. Some historians believe that one of the chief motives for the coup was his fear of losing even more votes in the upcoming elections. From the time of his coup until his demise, for obvious reasons, no reliable voting or popularity statistics were available.

Ideology
Ulmanis was a Latvian nationalist, who espoused the slogan "Latvia for Latvians" which meant that Latvia was to be a Latvian nation state, not a multinational state with traditional Baltic German elites and Jewish entrepreneurial class. At the same time, the slogan "Latvia's sun shines equally over everyone" was used and no ethnic group was actively targeted. A limited number of German, Jewish and other minority press and organizations continued to exist as far as the limitations of authoritarian dictatorship permitted. Yiddish newspapers were hit particularly hard. In practice only the religious party Agudat Israel's newspaper "Haint" was not forbidden, while popular publications "Dos Folk," "Frimorgn," "Riger Tog," and "Naier Fraitik" were closed. The official 1936 chamber of commerce list of newspapers and magazines does not list a single Yiddish, Hebrew or Jewish publication.

Latvianisation policies were followed in the area of education, cutting and removing subsidies for minority education. During Ulmanis' rule, education was strongly emphasized and literacy rates in Latvia reached high levels. Especially in eastern Latvia Latgale region however, education was actively used as a tool of assimilation of minorities. Many new schools were built, but they were Latvian schools and minority children were thus assimilated.

Economy

During his leadership, Latvia recorded major economic achievements. The state assumed a larger role in the economy and state capitalism was introduced by purchasing and uniting smaller competing private companies into larger state enterprises. This process was controlled by Latvijas Kredītbanka, a state bank established in 1935. Many large-scale building projects were undertaken - new schools, administrative buildings, Ķegums Hydroelectric Power Station. Due to an application of the economics of comparative advantage, the United Kingdom and Germany became Latvia's major trade partners, while trade with the USSR was reduced. The economy, especially the agriculture and manufacturing sectors, was micromanaged to an extreme degree. Ulmanis nationalised many industries. This resulted in rapid economic growth, during which Latvia attained a very high standard of living. At a time when most of the world's economy was still suffering from the effects of the Great Depression, Latvia could point to increases in both gross national product (GNP) and in exports of Latvian goods overseas. This, however, came at the cost of liberty and civil rights.

The policy of Ulmanis, even before his accession to power, was openly directed toward eliminating the minority groups from economic life and of giving Latvians of Latvian ethnicity access to all positions in the national economy. This was sometimes referred to as "Lettisation".  According to some estimates, about 90% of the banks and credit establishments in Latvia were state-owned or under Latvian management in 1939, against 20% in 1933. Alfrēds Birznieks, the minister of agriculture, in a speech delivered in Ventspils on 26 January 1936, said:

As a result, the economic and cultural influence of minorities – Germans, Jews, Russians, Poles – declined.

Latvia's first full-length sound movie "Zvejnieka dēls" (Fishermans' Son) was a tale of a young fisherman who tries to free other local fishermen from the power of a middleman and shows them that the future lies in cooperative work. The movie was based on a widely popular novel written by Vilis Lācis who in 1940 became the Prime Minister of the Soviet-occupied Latvian SSR.

Later life and death 
On 23 August 1939 Adolf Hitler's Germany and Joseph Stalin's USSR signed a non-aggression agreement, known as the Molotov–Ribbentrop Pact, which contained a secret addendum (revealed only in 1945), dividing Eastern Europe into spheres of influence. Latvia was thereby assigned to the Soviet sphere. Following a Soviet ultimatum in October 1939, Ulmanis signed the Soviet–Latvian Mutual Assistance Treaty and allowed the formation of Soviet military bases in Latvia. On 17 June 1940 Latvia was completely occupied by the Soviet Union. Rather than risk an unwinnable war, Ulmanis gave a nationwide radio address ordering no resistance to the Red Army, saying "I will remain in my place and you remain in yours".

For the next month, Ulmanis cooperated with the Soviets. He resigned as prime minister three days after the coup, and appointed a left-wing government headed by Augusts Kirhenšteins—which, in truth, had been chosen by the Soviet embassy. Soviet-controlled elections for a "People's Saeima" were held on 14–15 July, in which voters were presented with a single list from a Communist-dominated alliance. The new "People's Saeima" met on 21 July with only one order of business—a resolution proclaiming Latvia a Soviet republic and seeking admission to the Soviet Union, which carried unanimously.  This move was illegal under the Latvian Constitution, which stipulated that a major change to the basic constitutional order could only be enacted after two-thirds of the electorate approved it via a plebiscite. Since Latvia seceded from the Soviet Union in 1990, it has argued that the resolution seeking admission to the Soviet Union was illegal, and that the People's Saeima was elected in accordance with an illegal and unconstitutional election law.

Also on 21 July, Ulmanis was forced to resign and asked the Soviet government for a pension and permission to emigrate to Switzerland. Instead, he was arrested and sent to Stavropol in Russia, where he worked in his original profession as an agronom for a year. After the start of the German-Soviet war, he was imprisoned in July 1941. A year later, as German armies were closing in on Stavropol, he and other inmates were evacuated to prison in Krasnovodsk in present-day Turkmenistan. On the way there, he contracted dysentery and soon died on 20 September 1942. For a long time, his burial place was unknown. In 2011 Georgian media reported that Ulmanis may be buried in Gori City Cemetery, according to a former gravedigger who claimed that he was convoyed by KGB officers and had to dig the grave for Ulmanis. However, in 2017, Ulmanis' grand-nephew, Guntis Ulmanis, announced that the search had been called off as it was apparent the site would be impossible to find.

Later assessments 

Kārlis Ulmanis's legacy for Latvia and Latvians is a complex one. In the postwar Latvian SSR the Soviet régime labelled Ulmanis a fascist, indistinguishable from the Nazis, accusing him of corruption and of bloody repressions against Latvian workers. Ulmanis, in fact, had outlawed the fascist party and imprisoned its leader, Gustavs Celmiņš.

Among the postwar Latvian émigrés of Latvian cultural background in exile, Ulmanis was idealised by many of those who viewed his 6-year authoritarian rule as a Golden Age of the Latvian nation. Some traditions created by Ulmanis, such as the Draudzīgais aicinājums (charitable donations to one's former school), continued to be upheld.

In independent Latvia today, Ulmanis remains a popular, if also controversial figure. Many Latvians view him as a symbol of Latvia's independence in pre-World War II Latvia, and historians are generally in agreement about his positive early role as prime minister during the country's formative years. With regard to the authoritarian period, opinions diverge, however. On the one hand, it is possible to credit Ulmanis for the rise of ethnic Latvians' economic prosperity during the 1930s, and stress that under his rule there was not the same level of militarism or mass political oppression that characterized other dictatorships of the day. On the other hand, historians such as Ulmanis biographer Edgars Dunsdorfs are of the view that someone who disbanded Parliament and adopted authoritarian rule cannot be regarded as a positive figure, even if that rule was in some terms a prosperous one.

One sign that Ulmanis was still very popular in Latvia during the first years of regained independence was the election of his grand-nephew Guntis Ulmanis as President of Latvia in 1993.

One of the major traffic routes in Riga, the capital of Latvia, is named after him (Kārļa Ulmaņa gatve, previously named after Ernst Thälmann). In 2003, a monument of Ulmanis was unveiled in a park in Riga centre.

Personal life  and family
Not much is known about the personal life of Ulmanis. It is known that he never married and there are no records of him dating anyone. When once asked about why he is not married or has not had a significant other, his response was "I am married to Latvia, and that is enough for me." During his lifetime, there were rumors over his sexuality, with some claims that he might have been homosexual. The rumors were also fueled by Ulmanis' close relationships with two of his male employees. The rumors were also fueled by Ulmanis himself not giving any information about his personal life. He did not have any offspring, although his brother did, with Ulmanis' grandnephew Guntis Ulmanis later becoming the president of Latvia.

See also 
Latvian War of Independence
Freikorps in the Baltic
Latvian Provisional Government
Soviet occupation of Latvia in 1940
European interwar dictatorships

Notes

References

External links

  Biography
  Documents obtained and donated by Paul Berkay and transcribed by Sherri Goldberg and Margaret Kannensohn 
  Kārlis Ulmanis, Latvian, and Baltic History Collection at the University of Nebraska-Lincoln
  Biography by Edgars Dunsdorfs 
 

1877 births
1942 deaths
People from Dobele Municipality
People from Courland Governorate
Latvian Farmers' Union politicians
Presidents of Latvia
Prime Ministers of Latvia
Ministers of Foreign Affairs of Latvia
Ministers of Defence of Latvia
Ministers of Agriculture of Latvia
Members of the People's Council of Latvia
Deputies of the Constitutional Assembly of Latvia
Deputies of the 1st Saeima
Deputies of the 2nd Saeima
Deputies of the 3rd Saeima
Deputies of the 4th Saeima
Candidates for President of Latvia
Latvian anti-communists
Latvian people of World War I
Latvian people of World War II
World War II political leaders
Emigrants from the Russian Empire to the United States
University of Nebraska–Lincoln alumni
Latvian people who died in prison custody
Latvian people who died in Soviet detention
People who died in the Gulag
Latvian independence activists
Recipients of the Order of Lāčplēsis, 3rd class
Recipients of the Cross of Recognition
Order of the White Rose of Finland
Recipients of the Order of the Crown (Italy)
Recipients of the Order of Polonia Restituta
Order of Leopold (Belgium)
Recipients of the Order of Vasa
Recipients of the Order of the Crown (Belgium)
Order of Saint Olav
Recipients of the Order of the White Star, 1st Class
Recipients of the Order of Saint Maurice
Order of Pope Pius IX
Chevaliers of the Légion d'honneur
Grand Croix of the Légion d'honneur
Knights Grand Cross of the Order of Pope Pius IX
Grand Crosses of the Order of the Crown (Belgium)
Knights Grand Cross of the Order of Saints Maurice and Lazarus
Grand Crosses with Golden Chain of the Order of Vytautas the Great
Grand Crosses of the Order of Polonia Restituta
Collars of the Order of the White Lion
Commanders Grand Cross of the Order of the Polar Star
Recipients of the Croix de Guerre 1914–1918 (France)
Recipients of the Military Order of the Cross of the Eagle, Class I
Recipients of the Order of the White Eagle (Poland)